Roald Dahl's Guide to Railway Safety was published in 1991 by the British Railways Board.  The British Railways Board had asked Roald Dahl to write the text of the booklet, and Quentin Blake to illustrate it, to help young people enjoy using the railways safely.  It was published a year after Dahl's death.

The booklet is structured as a conversation with children.  In the introduction, Dahl laments that adults are always telling children what to do and what not to do, and says he would not have agreed to write the booklet, which tells children what to do, if not for the importance of what he is about to discuss.  He then goes on to list the "dreaded DOs and DON'Ts" of railway safety – such as not to ride a bicycle or skateboard on a station platform, stand on platform edges, walk along rail tracks, or open train doors while the train is moving.

Many of the rules of safety given in the booklet are accompanied by humorous or sobering Blake illustrations.  Some of the DOs and DON'Ts also include anecdotes from Dahl—sometimes personal, sometimes statistical—reinforcing why they are important rules to follow.

Distribution

The booklet was distributed in UK primary schools to pupils in 1991, often alongside video presentations of railway safety films, such as Robbie.

1991 children's books
Children's books by Roald Dahl
Books published posthumously
Books by Roald Dahl
Children's non-fiction books